Leichhardteus is a genus of Australian corinnid sac spiders first described by B. C. Baehr & Robert Raven in 2013.

Species
 it contains eleven species:
Leichhardteus albofasciatus Baehr & Raven, 2013 – Australia (Queensland, New South Wales)
Leichhardteus badius Baehr & Raven, 2013 – Australia (Queensland)
Leichhardteus bimaculatus Baehr & Raven, 2013 – Australia (Queensland)
Leichhardteus conopalpis Baehr & Raven, 2013 (type) – Eastern Australia
Leichhardteus evschlingeri Raven, 2015 – Australia (Western Australia)
Leichhardteus garretti Baehr & Raven, 2013 – Australia (Queensland)
Leichhardteus kroombit Baehr & Raven, 2013 – Australia (Queensland, New South Wales)
Leichhardteus reinhardi Baehr & Raven, 2013 – Australia (Queensland)
Leichhardteus strzelecki Raven, 2015 – Australia (Victoria)
Leichhardteus terriirwinae Baehr & Raven, 2013 – Australia (Queensland)
Leichhardteus yagan Raven, 2015 – Australia (Western Australia)

References

Araneomorphae genera
Corinnidae
Spiders of Australia